For Never & Ever is Kill Hannah's major label debut album, released October 14, 2003. It features the single, "Kennedy". The album was mixed by Tim Palmer

Track listing
All songs written by Mat Devine.
"They Can't Save Us Now"  – 3:36
"Kennedy"  – 3:47
"10 More Minutes with You"  – 3:44
"New Heart for Xmas"  – 4:04
"Boys & Girls"  – 3:13
"From Now On"  – 3:03
"Raining All the Time"  – 3:37
"Race the Dream"  – 3:36
"Unwanted"  – 3:27
"Is Anyone Here Alive?"  – 3:38
"No One Dreams Anyway*"  – 6:23

Recording band
Dan Wiese – guitars, pedals
Jon Radtke – guitars, synth
Mat Devine – lead vocals, guitars, piano
Greg Corner – bass
Garret Hammond – drums, percussion

Other songs
 "Big Shot"
Released on the compilation album Bam Margera Presents: Viva La Bands; previously recorded in 2000 and released as a free download on the band's web site.
 "Goodnight, Goodbye"
Released on the Lips Like Morphine EP.
"Nerve Gas"
Released on the UK version of Until There's Nothing Left of Us; previously recorded in 1997 and released on the Stunt Pilots EP and Here Are the Young Moderns; also recorded for 1999's American Jet Set.

2003 albums
Atlantic Records albums
Kill Hannah albums